St. Edward High School is a boys, private, Roman Catholic high school in Lakewood, Ohio, United States. It was founded in 1949 and is operated in the Holy Cross tradition by the Midwest Province of the Brothers of Holy Cross. It is one of three remaining boys Catholic high schools in the Greater Cleveland area (Benedictine and St. Ignatius being the others) and has an enrollment of 970 students, as of the 2021-2022 school year.

History 
St. Edward High School was founded in 1949 by the Brothers of Holy Cross and named in honor of Saint Edward the Confessor. It was also a nod toward Archbishop Edward F. Hoban, the head of the Diocese of Cleveland who invited the Brothers of Holy Cross to start several Catholic high schools in the Cleveland suburbs after World War II. The Brothers of Holy Cross would start Gilmour Academy in 1946 in the eastern suburb of Gates Mills, St. Edward in the western suburbs, and Archbishop Hoban High School in 1953 in nearby Akron, Ohio.  The first graduating class of 1953 consisted of 159 students, including several prominent Clevelanders, most notably talk show host Phil Donahue.

Academics 
The school offers a college-preparatory oriented curriculum as well as several specialized programs, including a pre-engineering and entrepreneurship programs, typically reserved for college campuses.  The pre-engineering program was founded in 2001 and is housed in the Joseph & Helen Lowe Institute for Innovation. In the 2008-2009 school year, the school began offering senior grade level students an entrepreneurship program, which is based on Planning The Entrepreneurial Venture concept created by the Ewing Marion Kauffman Foundation.  The Layden Entrepreneurship Program is structured to develop basic business techniques including finance, team-building, planning, etc. over the course of three years.  The completed business plans are ranked, with the students competing for an endowed scholarship totaling $20,000 or more.

In the fall of 2010, St. Edward began to offer the International Baccalaureate Diploma Programme.

St. Edward has three student-produced publications: a literary and art magazine called Flight, a yearbook titled Edwardian, and a monthly newspaper/news magazine called the Edsman.

St. Edward's Latin Club, The Knights of the Tiber, functions as a local chapter of both the Ohio Junior Classical League (OJCL) and National Junior Classical League (NJCL).

The school was recognized by the United States Department of Education as a "Blue Ribbon School" for the 1994-1995, 1995-1996, and 2018-2019 school years.

Demographics
St. Edward's student body includes students from all over Northeast Ohio. Many come from Catholic elementary schools, while others enroll after finishing at public or secular private elementary, junior high, or middle schools. The 970 young men enrolled at St. Edward come from a variety of race, economic, and religious strata. Roughly 25% of students are first generation, and 24% are students of color.

Campus 

Construction on the school's current facility began in 1949 on a site that once served as a resting and feeding stop for cattle trains passing through from western states to eastern markets on what is now known as the Norfolk Southern roadbed. Classes began immediately in a temporary location roughly three blocks west of the school’s current location in the building of the former St. Theresa's Academy.  A year later, new freshmen were taught in makeshift classrooms in the basement of St. James Grade School, located roughly 1.5 miles away at the corner of Detroit Road and Granger avenues.

In 2000, the school began a capital campaign to upgrade and transform the physical plant, including a new gym, weight room and indoor track. The Kahl Student Life & Leadership Center, named for Manco founder Jack Kahl, was dedicated in 2004.  Coughlin Field includes a synthetic, all-weather athletic field as well as an outdoor track.

On July 31, 2008, St. Edward dedicated a $3.4 million Joseph & Helen Lowe Pre-Engineering and Technology Center. The facility was named after the parents of Greg Lowe, the senior vice president of High-Performance Analog Business Units at Texas Instruments and a 1980 graduate of the high school.

The new Holy Family Chapel, topped with a decorative gold dome - in recognition of the University of Notre Dame in South Bend, Indiana, which is also a Holy Cross institution, was dedicated on September 29, 2008. The chapel contains a bronze sculpture of Jesus on the cross created by St. Edward alumnus and sculptor James McKenna who also makes each head bust for the Pro Football Hall of Fame.

In September 2016, St. Edward launched its Courage to Act capital campaign revolving around three pillars: Affordability, Innovation, and Hospitality. At the beginning of the 2019-2020 school year, it was announced that the campaign raised over $23.7 million. This sum was used to increase the school's endowment; expand the Joseph & Helen Lowe Pre-Engineering and Technology Center, renaming it the Joseph & Helen Lowe Institute for Innovation; and construct a new entrance, dining hall, and courtyard called The Commons, which will open prior to the start of the 2020-2021 school year.

Athletic programs 

Since 1978, the St. Edward athletic program has won a record 75 Ohio High School Athletic Association|OHSAA]] team state championships and 11 national championships.

Football Program
St. Edward has emerged as a perennial contender for the OHSAA Division 1 State Championship having achieved six titles in thirteen years: 2010, 2014, 2015, 2018, 2021, & 2022. St Edward Has Finished in Top 5 National High School Football Rankings 3X & 3X Top 15 finishes in the National High School Football Rankings.

Wrestling program
Since 1959, the wrestling program has produced:
 36 OHSAA Wrestling Team State Championships - 1978, 1979, 1980, 1981, 1982, 1983, 1984, 1985, 1986, 1987, 1989, 1992, 1997, 1998, 1999, 2000, 2001, 2002, 2003, 2004, 2005, 2006, 2007, 2008, 2009, 2011, 2012, 2013, 2015, 2016, 2017, 2018, 2019, 2021, 2022 and 2023.
 8 OHSAA Wrestling Dual Team State Championships - 2013, 2016, 2017, 2019, 2020, 2021, 2022 and 2023.

Ice hockey program
The Eagles ice hockey team has won 11 OHSAA state titles, which is an Ohio state record for that sport.

Former WHA/AHL goalie, Bob Whidden, was named the coach in 1984. In his first year as coach, Whidden's Eagles won the 1985 OHSAA State Champions. Whidden retired in 2005, having coached the team to ten state titles during his tenure and was named to the St. Edward's Athletic Hall of Fame in 2009. In 2005, St. Ed’s hired Whidden’s son, Rob who in 2008, led his alma mater to their 11th state title. He was fired prior to the 2010 season. From 2010-2018, the Eagles were coached by Troy Gray, who played as a winger on the 1985 team. In 2019, St. Edward named Tim Sullivan ‘92 as the new head coach after mutually parting ways with Troy Gray. 

Eagles alumni Todd Harkins, Brett Harkins, and Michael Rupp, all played professionally.

 Ice hockey State Championships - 1985, 1986, 1990, 1992, 1994, 1995, 1996, 2002, 2004, 2005, 2008

Other sports
The Ohio High School Athletic Association has awarded the school the following state championships:
 Basketball – 1998, 2014
 Baseball - 1998, 2008, 2010
 Track & Field (Outdoor) - 2012, 2013

Historic rivalries
The two main historic rivalries are with St. Joseph High School (now Villa Angela-St. Joseph or VASJ) and St. Ignatius High School.

The St. Joseph rivalry pitted a large school on the east side of Cleveland (St. Joseph) against a large west suburban school (St. Edward).  After merging with Villa Angela Academy in the 1990s to become VASJ, the enrollment of VASJ dropped and the rivalry faded.  However, the Eagles and Vikings' basketball teams still play an annual game.

With the rise to football and overall sport prominence of St. Ignatius, along with the proximity of the two schools, St. Ignatius replaced St. Joseph/VASJ as the main rival of St. Edward, while St. Edward replaced Cathedral Latin (which closed and later merged with Notre Dame Academy) as the main rival for St. Ignatius.

Notable alumni

References

External links 

 

Holy Cross secondary schools
High schools in Cuyahoga County, Ohio
International Baccalaureate schools in Ohio
Catholic secondary schools in Ohio
Boys' schools in Ohio
Lakewood, Ohio
Educational institutions established in 1949
1949 establishments in Ohio
Roman Catholic Diocese of Cleveland